The 1995 Copa del Rey was the 59th edition of the Spanish basketball Cup. It was organized by the ACB and was played in Granada in the Palacio de Deportes between March 3 and 5, 1995. Taugrés Baskonia won its first title after defeating Amway Zaragoza in the final game.

Competition format
The top four teams in the 1993–94 ACB season (FC Barcelona, Real Madrid, Joventut Badalona and Estudiantes) joined directly the Final Eight stage, which would be played during the 1994–95 ACB season.

The other four places would be decided in a tournament called League of the Cup that was played in April and May 1994, with the eliminated teams in the play-offs of the 1993–94 season. Eliminated teams in the round of 16 would be divided into two groups of four teams. The two first qualified teams would play a playoff qualifier with each one of the four quarterfinalists to get a spot in the Final Eight.

As OAR Ferrol was dissolved before the 1994–95 season, its spot would be decided in a best-of-three playoff between Cáceres and Amway Zaragoza.

League of the Cup

Group stage

Group A

Group B

Playoffs
The two first qualified teams of each group would play a last qualifying playoff against the four quarterfinalists of the 1993–94 season.

Repechage playoff
As OAR Ferrol resigned to its berth in Liga ACB, a repechage playoff was played in December 1994 and January 1995. The winner of this best-of-three series would take the vacant spot at the Final Eight of the competition.

|}

Final Eight Bracket

Final

MVP of the Tournament: Pablo Laso

References

External links
Boxscores at ACB.com
Linguasport

Copa del Rey de Baloncesto
1994–95 in Spanish basketball